Le Rozier is a commune in the Lozère department in southern France.

Geography
The river Jonte joins the Tarn in Le Rozier.

See also

Communes of the Lozère department
Causse Méjean

References

Rozier